A Matter of Confidence or Issue of Confidence is an important bill—such as a budget—put before by the responsible house (i.e. the house directly elected by the people).  If a government fails to pass a bill considered a matter of confidence, it is assumed the government has lost the confidence of the house and the bill is treated as a Motion of No Confidence.

See also
Motion of No Confidence

Motions of no confidence